Streets I Have Walked is an album by Harry Belafonte, released in 1963. The album contains songs from around the world as well as gospel songs. It reached #30 on the Billboard Albums 200, making it his last studio album to reach the top 40.

Track listing
 "Sit Down" – 2:29	 
 "Erev Shel Shoshanim" (Moshe Dor, Yosef Hadar) – 3:11	 
 "Waltzing Matilda" (Traditional) – 3:14	 
 "My Old Paint" (Traditional) – 3:27	 
 "Mangwene Mpulele" (Traditional) – 3:30	 
 "This Land Is Your Land" (Woody Guthrie) – 3:02	 
 "Tunga" (John P. Gonsalves) – 3:13	 
 "Sakura" (Traditional Japanese. English lyrics by Marilyn Keith and Alan Bergman) – 3:57	 
 "Amen" (Jester Hairston) – 3:05	 
 "The Borning Day" (Fred Hellerman, Fran Minkoff) – 3:31	 
 "This Wicked Race" – 3:05	 
 "Come Away Melinda" (Hellerman, Minkoff) – 2:28

Personnel
Harry Belafonte – vocals
William Eaton – guitar
Ernie Calabria – guitar
Jay Berliner – guitar
John Cartwright – bass
Percy Brice – drums
Ralph MacDonald – percussion
Springfield Gardens Junior High School No. 59 Choir – vocals
Production notes:
Bob Bollard – producer
Orchestra and chorus directed by Howard Roberts
Harry Belafonte – liner notes
Bob Simpson – engineer
Ed Begley – tape mastering
Roy De Carava – cover photo

Chart positions

References

1963 albums
Harry Belafonte albums
RCA Records albums